Reflections on Language is a 1975 book in which MIT linguist Noam Chomsky argues for a rationalist approach to human nature. Under this approach, specific capabilities are innate to humans, as opposed to an empiricist approach in which there is no innate human nature but rather a "blank slate" upon which psychological and social forces act. The New York Times selected the book as among the year's best.

References

Bibliography

Further reading 

 
 
 
 
 
 
 
 
 
 
 

1975 non-fiction books
Books by Noam Chomsky
English-language books
Random House books
Linguistics books